= Chinasa T. Okolo =

Researcher in governance of Artificial Intelligence

- Born: Kansas City, Missouri, USA
- Known for: Artificial Intelligence

Academic background
- Education: Cornell University; Pomona College
- Thesis: [catalog.library.cornell.edu/catalog/16219327 AI Explainability in the Global South: Towards an Inclusive Praxis for Emerging Technology Users] (2023)

Academic work
- Institutions: World Bank Group; United Nations; Brookings Institution
- Website: chinasatokolo.github.io

Chinasa T. Okolo is the Founder and Scientific Director of Technecultura and a consultant for the United Nations and the World Bank. She works on governance of Artificial Intelligence (AI).

== Early life ==
Okolo’s parents immigrated to the US from Nigeria. She was born and grew up in Kansas City, Missouri. Okolo explained that her research interests are influenced by her awareness of structural racism and global inequities. She has a twin brother.

== Education and training ==
Okolo completed her bachelor's degree at the Pomona College in California and her master's degree in computer science and Ph.D. in computer science from Cornell University.

During her studies, Okolo researched computer vision and its applications in biomedical settings. She distinguished herself through the use of ethnographic methods to research AI perceptions in healthcare domains across the Global South.

Okolo completed internships with Microsoft and Apple.

During her studies, she referred to Twitter as an important source of information for her.

== Research and recognition ==
Okolo is a former Fellow in the Center for Technology Innovation at The Brookings Institution. She advised the African Union's Continental AI Strategy and Nigeria’s national AI strategy, with a focus on responsible AI adoption.

Okolo was listed by Forbes magazines among Forbes 30 Under 30 in the AI 2025 category.

In 2024, she was included on TIME Magazine’s list of 100 most influential people in AI.
